Criminal Minds: Beyond Borders is an American police procedural television series created by Erica Messer that aired on CBS from March 16, 2016, to May 17, 2017. The show is produced by The Mark Gordon Company in association with CBS Television Studios and ABC Studios. The production is a spin-off from original series, Criminal Minds, airing on the same network, and is the third series in the Criminal Minds franchise. Criminal Minds: Beyond Borders follows an elite team of FBI agents of the fictional International Response Team (IRT) tasked with solving cases that involve American citizens on international soil.

CBS aired a backdoor pilot on an episode of Criminal Minds on April 8, 2015, introducing the characters with a crossover episode eponymously titled "Beyond Borders". The series was originally intended to premiere on March 2, 2016, but was pushed back by two weeks and instead premiered on March 16, 2016, and filled the Wednesday 10:00pm time slot, airing immediately after the original Criminal Minds.

On May 14, 2017, CBS canceled the series after two seasons.

Characters

Main
 Jack Garrett (Gary Sinise), Senior Supervisory Special Agent and International Unit Chief. 
Garrett is a 20-year veteran agent with the FBI and is the Unit Chief of the International Response Team (IRT). In his personal life, Garrett is married to Karen (Sherry Stringfield) and together have six children, including their oldest, a son named Ryan and their middle child, a daughter named Josie.
 Clara Seger (Alana de la Garza), Senior Supervisory Special Agent, Linguistics Specialist, and Cultural Anthropologist. 
 Seger is a smart, well-traveled, and multi-lingual cultural anthropologist and special agent with the IRT. Before rejoining the IRT in October 2015, Seger was married to a man named Brad who was a fellow agent and, like her, knew Jack. In 2013, she took a sabbatical from the FBI after her husband Brad died, during which she visited countries across the globe.
 Matthew Simmons (Daniel Henney), Supervisory Special Agent and Special Operations Agent. 
 Simmons is a Special Operations agent and special agent with the IRT. Simmons is married to his wife Kristy (Kelly Frye) and has a total of four children, including two boys Jake and David and twin daughters, all of them under the age of three. He was a former member of a Special Ops unit, and his experience with the unit allowed him to hone his profiling skills.
 Russ Montgomery (Tyler James Williams), Supervisory Special Agent and Technical Analyst. 
 Montgomery is a technical analyst with the IRT. He upholds a positive attitude, though he shows it in a different way. In addition to his job as a technical analyst, he liaises with the families of victims on the American homeland while the rest of his group is away.
 Mae Jarvis (Annie Funke), Supervisory Special Agent and Medical Examiner. 
 Jarvis is a medical examiner and special agent with the IRT. Young and spunky, Mae has a fun-loving sibling relationship with Simmons and was in the FBI purely as a medical examiner before being brought onto the IRT as a resident medical examiner to bypass the bureaucratic red tape in various countries. By the events of the first season, Mae had become a fully qualified FBI field agent, in addition to being the IRT's resident ME.

Recurring
 Karen Garrett (Sherry Stringfield), Jack's wife and the mother of their six children.
 Josie Garrett (Brittany Uomoleale), the middle daughter of Jack and Karen Garrett's six children. 
 Kristy Simmons (Kelly Frye), the wife of Matthew Simmons and the mother of their four children, Jake and David Simmons and their two daughters.
 Jake Simmons (Ezra Dewey), the son of Matthew and Kristy Simmons and the brother to David Simmons.
 David Simmons (Declan Whaley), the son of Matthew and Kristy Simmons and the brother to Jake Simmons.
 Ryan Garrett (Matt Cohen), Jack's and Karen's oldest son who was accepted to and received training at the FBI Academy. He later becomes an undercover agent in Mexico, where he crosses paths with the IRT in the second season.

Episodes

In total 26 episodes of Beyond Borders have aired, in addition to the pilot episode, "Beyond Borders".

Production
A proposed new series in the Criminal Minds franchise was announced in January 2015, and was to be named Criminal Minds: Beyond Borders. Former CSI: NY star Gary Sinise and Anna Gunn had been cast in the lead roles of Jack Garrett and Lily Lambert, with Tyler James Williams and Daniel Henney being cast as Russ "Monty" Montgomery and Matthew "Matt" Simmons, respectively.

On May 8, 2015, CBS announced that Criminal Minds: Beyond Borders had been picked up for the 2015–16 season; however, it was soon announced that Gunn had departed the series, with Alana de la Garza and Annie Funke further being cast as series regulars.

Reception

Critical response
The first season of Criminal Minds: Beyond Borders received generally unfavorable reviews from critics. The review aggregator Rotten Tomatoes gave the first season a 20% of approval with an average rating of 3.5/10, based on 15 reviews, with the critical consensus reading, "Beyond Borders relies on the same characters and storylines the franchise has used for years, with an extra undertow of xenophobic paranoia." On Metacritic, the season was given a score of 28 out of 100, based on 11 critics, indicating "generally unfavorable reviews".

The series has received criticism from both viewers and critics for its "inaccurate" depictions of the countries the episodes are set in. In its review of the show, pop culture news website The A.V. Club labeled the series as "bland" and "xenophobic". In a more scathing commentary, Slate and USA Today have opined that the show was "jingoistic", especially due to the then-current context of Donald Trump's allegedly xenophobic 2016 presidential campaign rhetoric. Following the airing of the episode "Cinderella and the Dragon", which was set in Singapore, the network received significant backlash from locals regarding the "misleading" representations of Singapore and Singaporeans, with local Internet celebrity blogger mrbrown and the Singapore Tourism Board posting up their own satirical responses.

Ratings 
Seasonal rankings (based on average total viewers per episode) of Criminal Minds: Beyond Borders.

 Note: Each US network television season starts in late September and ends in late May, which coincides with the completion of May sweeps.

International broadcast
The series premiered in Australia on the Seven Network in April 2016. In Canada, the series airs simultaneously with the U.S. on CTV. The series also airs same day as the U.S. in Asia on AXN. On April 20, 2016, the series premiered on W in the United Kingdom and Ireland. On July 11, 2016, the series premiered on TV One in New Zealand.

References

External links 

 
 

 
2010s American crime drama television series
2010s American mystery television series
2010s American police procedural television series
2016 American television series debuts
2017 American television series endings
American television spin-offs
CBS original programming
English-language television shows
Television series by ABC Studios
Television series by CBS Studios
Television series by Entertainment One
Television shows set in Africa
Television shows set in Asia
Television shows set in Europe
Television shows set in North America
Television shows set in Oceania
Television shows set in South America